Physiological anisocoria is when human pupils differ in size. It is generally considered to be benign, though it must be distinguished from Congenital Horner's syndrome, pharmacological dilatation or other conditions connected to the sympathetic nervous system.
The prevalence of physiological anisocoria has not been found to be influenced by the sex, age, or iris color of the subject.

Presentation
The main characteristic that distinguishes physiological anisocoria is an increase of pupil size with lower light or reduced illumination, such that the pupils differ in size between the two eyes. At any given eye examination, up to 41% of healthy patients can show an anisocoria of 0.4 mm or more at one time or another. It can also occur as the difference between both pupils varies from day to day.  A normal population survey showed that during poor light or near dark conditions, differences of 1 mm on average between pupils was found. 
The presence of physiologic anisocoria has been estimated at 20% of the normal population, so some degree of pupil difference may be expected in at least 1 in 5 clinic patients.

Causes
When detected during childhood, without any other symptoms and when other disorders are discarded through clinical tests, it should be considered a developmental or genetic phenomenon.
Asymmetric pupil or dyscoria, potential causes of anisocoria, refer to an abnormal shape of the pupil which can happens due to developmental and intrauterine anomalies.
When light is shined in the abnormal eye and it remains dilated then it’s a pathological small pupil.

References

Eye diseases